Zhu Lin (born November 7, 1933) is a retired Chinese politician and economist, and the widow of former Chinese Premier Li Peng.

Biography
Zhu was born in Shanghai, on November 7, 1933. Her father Zhu Jixun was a businessman. After graduating from Heilongjiang University, she was dispatched to the Jilin Chemical Plant as an interpreter. Later she served as head of the Foreign Affairs Office of North China Electric Power Bureau, director of the Beijing Office of Guangdong Daya Bay Nuclear Power Plant, and director of the Research Office of the Special Administrative Region Office of the State Council. She also served as vice president of the China National Committee on Care for Children and the China Women Development Foundation.

Personal life
Zhu was married to Li Peng on July 10, 1958.

References

Bibliography

1933 births
Living people
People from Shanghai
Heilongjiang University alumni
People's Republic of China politicians from Shanghai
Chinese Communist Party politicians from Shanghai